Jennifer "Jenny" Simons, married Geerlings (born 5 September 1953 in Paramaribo) is a Surinamese politician. On 30 June 2010, she was elected as Chairperson of the National Assembly of Suriname with 26 out of 50 votes. Simons is the second female chairman of the Surinamese Parliament. She was re-elected on 30 June 2015. She announced her retirement on 20 June 2020.

Biography
Simons was first elected as a member of the National Assembly in 1996, representing the district of Paramaribo. She served as one of the vice-chairpersons of the National Democratic Party, which was founded by former leader Dési Bouterse. She was leader of the parliamentary fraction from 2000 until 2006.

In April 2012, Simons was accused by the opposition in the parliament of dictatorial behaviour because of her decision to forbid members of the parliament from referring to the amnesty law of April 2012 during a debate on the anti-stalking law.

On 8 April 2020, the Law Exceptional Condition COVID-19 (State of Emergency) has been approved by the National Assembly in order to fight against the coronavirus pandemic. The State of Emergency will go into effect for three months unless the National Assembly one-off extends the duration for another three months. Simons was appointed to lead the Parliamentary COVID-19 Crisis Management Team.

On 20 June 2020, Simons announced her retirement from politics. She had been elected in the 2020 Surinamese general election, but has decided not to take her seat. Stephen Tsang who was on 6th place on the NDP list, is now eligible for the National Assembly.

Personal background

Family 
On 29 June 1981, Simons married Glenn Geerlings. They have 3 children: Edward, Jonathan and Naomi. Simons is a dermatologist.

References

External links

1953 births
Living people
Speakers of the National Assembly (Suriname)
Members of the National Assembly (Suriname)
National Democratic Party (Suriname) politicians
People from Paramaribo
Surinamese women in politics
Anton de Kom University of Suriname alumni
21st-century women politicians
20th-century women politicians